The SRU Super Series, known as the FOSROC Super Series for sponsorship reasons, and prior to 2023 known as Super 6 is a professional league for Scottish rugby union clubs, which began in 2019. As of 2023, the league consists of two competitions;
 
 FOSROC Super Series Sprint Season (previously Super6 Sprint) - running from April to June, involving a single round robin between the six core teams, with a single added game for each team against either Edinburgh Rugby A or Glasgow Warriors A, followed by two further matches to decide final positions; The URC 'A' sides are not themselves part of the competition, playing only three matches each, but the results against them form part of the six main team's records. 
  FOSROC Super Series Championship, (previously Super6 Championship) the primary competition involving a full double round robin among the core six teams plus a Scotland Under 20 Development side, and a series of play-offs.

The league is designed to bridge the gap between the amateur grade and the fully professional United Rugby Championship teams.

Six core clubs contest the league, joined by the Scotland Under 20 development team from 2023. In 2019, the six core teams entered into a contract for 5 years and there is planned to be no relegation or replacement in that period.

The top level of club rugby in Scotland consists of the two professional teams - Edinburgh Rugby and Glasgow Warriors - that play in the United Rugby Championship competition. They assign their players to the clubs below in a Pro-Draft; so that they can still play when not used by the professional sides.

Concept

Six clubs were awarded licences to play in the new Super 6 league by the Scottish Rugby Union.

The idea of the Super 6 was to bridge a perceived gap between the Scottish Premiership and the then Pro14 league (now the United Rugby Championship league) level to aid player progression. The six clubs will be turned into professional clubs with a squad budget of £125,000 each. Every team will have a 35-man squad.

Seasons

The Super 6 tournament began in November 2019 after the rugby world cup of that year.

It was planned that the clubs would play 20 fixtures in total: 10 fixtures against one another home and away and then 2 play-off matches - which would conclude the Super 6 fixtures. A further 8 matches scheduled against non-Scottish clubs would then be played by the Super 6 clubs but this was to be outside the Super 6 competition.

The first season was curtailed after the league finished and there were no play-off matches due to the COVID-19 pandemic.

The tournament did not run in season 2020-21 due to the COVID-19 pandemic.

The Ayrshire Bulls became the inaugural Super 6 champions after defeating The Southern Knights at Dam Park in the playoff final.

In November 2021, plans were announced that the tournament would be expanded in 2022 to include two new teams, including one from Glasgow and English based RFU Championship London Scottish.However, plans for this did not come to fruition in time for the 2023 Season

Criticism

There has been a number of controversies surrounding the creation of the new league:- some argued that the gap between the Scottish Premiership and Pro14 isn't that great. For a so-called 'amateur' league, Scottish Premiership sides often played well against professional sides. Glasgow Hawks famously beating Toulouse in February 1998 a case in point.

The main criticism of the new league is the geographical split. No less than half the league's clubs are based in Edinburgh. There are no clubs from Scotland's biggest city, Glasgow - even though Glasgow Hawks did apply to join; and rugby union in the city markedly on the up with Glasgow Warriors regularly selling out Scotstoun Stadium and providing the Pro14 with their highest ever attendance for a final. Similarly there are no clubs from Aberdeen, Dundee or Inverness represented, although only Dundee HSFP applied to join out of the clubs from those cities. This, it is argued, does not help the game grow in Scotland.

Another argument is money. The initial money, capped by the Scottish Rugby Union, will only provide players with essentially a part time wage. Thus, most will need to secure other employment. Again, sceptics may point to this as not helping the players develop.

Clubs

References

Rugby union leagues in Scotland
2019 establishments in Scotland
Scotland
Sports leagues established in 2019
Super 6 (rugby union)
Professional sports leagues in the United Kingdom